Recoil is the backward momentum of a gun when it is discharged.

Recoil may also refer to:

Film and television 
 The Recoil (1917 film), an American silent drama film directed by George Fitzmaurice
 The Recoil (1922 film), a British silent crime film directed by Geoffrey Malins
 The Recoil (1924 film), an American silent drama film directed by T. Hayes Hunter
 Recoil (1953 film), a British crime film directed by John Gilling
 Recoil (1998 film), an American action film starring Gary Daniels
 Recoil (2011 film), a Canadian action film starring "Stone Cold" Steve Austin and Danny Trejo
 "Recoil" (CSI: Miami), a television episode
 "Recoil" (The Shield), a television episode

Literature 
 Recoil (magazine), an American firearms magazine
 Recoil, a 1953 novel by Jim Thompson
 Recoil, a 2006 Nick Stone Missions novel by Andy McNab
 Recoil, a 2008 StarFist: Force Recon Series novel by David Sherman and Dan Cragg

Music 
 Recoil (band), a musical project led by ex-Depeche Mode member Alan Wilder
 Recoil (album), by Nonpoint, 2004
 "Recoil", a song by Ani DiFranco from Knuckle Down, 2005
 "Recoil", a song by Daysend from Within the Eye of Chaos, 2010
 "Recoil", a song by Flesh Field from Strain, 2004
 "Recoil", a song by Magazine from Real Life, 1978
 "Recoil", a song by New Order from Lost Sirens, 2013
 "Recoil", a song by TZU from Smiling at Strangers, 2005

Science
 Atomic recoil, in physics, a result of a type of particle interaction
 Recoil (fluid behavior), a rheological phenomenon in non-Newtonian fluids

Other uses 
 Recoil (G.I. Joe), a fictional character in the G.I. Joe universe
 Recoil (video game), a 1999 tank-based Windows computer game
 Recoil (Wonderla Hyderabad), a roller coaster in India
 Recoil Glacier, Antarctica

See also